The  men's 400 metre freestyle was one of six swimming events on the swimming at the 1908 Summer Olympics programme. Its distance was the median of the 3 individual freestyle event distances. It was the first time an event over 400 metres was held at the Olympics (after a 440-yard contest was held in 1904). The competition was held from Monday July 13, 1908 to Thursday July 16, 1908.

Each nation could enter up to 12 swimmers. Twenty-five swimmers from ten nations competed.

Records

These were the standing world and Olympic records (in minutes) prior to the 1908 Summer Olympics.

(*) 440 yards (= 402.34 m)

In the final Henry Taylor set the first official world record for this distance in 5:36.8 minutes.

Competition format

With a much larger field than in 1904, the 1908 competition expanded to three rounds: heats, semifinals, and a final. The 1908 Games also restored the wild-card system from 1900, allowing the fastest swimmers who did not win their heat to advance. The nine heats consisted of between 1 and 5 swimmers, with the winner of the heat advancing along with the fastest loser from across the heats (all tied swimmers advanced in the case of equal times). There were two semifinals, intended to be of 5 swimmers each but one of which actually had 4 due to a withdrawal; the top 2 finishers in each semifinal (regardless of overall time) advanced to the 4-person final.

Each race involved four lengths of the 100 metre pool. Any stroke could be used.

Results

First round

The fastest swimmer in each heat and the fastest loser advanced, qualifying 10 swimmers for the semifinals.

Heat 1

Heat 2

Heat 3

Tartakover had no competition in the third heat.

Heat 4

Heat 5

Heat 6

Heat 7

Heat 8

Zachár had no competition in the eighth heat.

Heat 9

Semifinals

The fastest two swimmers from each semifinal advanced to the final.

Semifinal 1

Semifinal 2

Final

References

Sources
 
 

Men's freestyle 0400 metres